Max Knaake (1886–1968) was a German art director.

Selected filmography
 La Boheme (1923)
 Curfew (1925)
 Battle of the Sexes (1926)
 The Sporck Battalion (1927)
 Hurrah! I Live! (1928)
 The Sinner (1928)
 Taxi at Midnight (1929)
 Storm of Love (1929)
 Farewell (1930)
 Today Is the Day (1933)
 Must We Get Divorced? (1933)
 At the Strasbourg (1934)
 Counsel for Romance (1936)
 Men, Animals and Sensations (1938)
 Glück bei Frauen (1944)
 Elephant Fury (1953)
 Wer seine Frau lieb hat (1955)

References

Bibliography
 Greco, Joseph. The File on Robert Siodmak in Hollywood, 1941-1951. Universal-Publishers, 1999.

External links

1886 births
1968 deaths
German art directors
Film people from Berlin